The DRDO Bharat is a light surveillance quadcopter unmanned aerial vehicle developed by the Defence Research and Development Organisation for the Indian Army.

The drone has been created by the Chandigarh-based laboratory of the DRDO for carrying out accurate surveillance in high-altitude areas and mountainous terrain along India's lines of control with Pakistan and China.

References 

Military equipment of India
DRDO aircraft
Proposed aircraft of India
DRDO Bharat
Quadcopters